For the portuguese philosopher of the same name, see Pedro da Fonseca (philosopher)
Pedro da Fonseca (14th century – 22 August 1422) was a Portuguese Cardinal who served as Bishop of Astorga,  1414–1418, and Bishop of Sigüenza, 1419–1422.

Biography
He was born in Olivença. On 14 December 1412, he was made Cardinal-priest of Sant'Angelo in Pescheria by the Avignon Antipope Benedict XIII. On 5 June 1413, Pedro da Fonseca was appointed Administrator of Astorga and on 6 Jun 1419, he was transferred to the Diocese of Sigüenza where he served as Administrator until his resignation on 7 Jun 1419. Accepting the decisions made at the Council of Pisa and Council of Constance, Cardinal Fonseca formally recognized Martin V as Pope. Following Byzantine Emperor Manuel II and Patriarch Joseph II's request for legation, Fonseca was sent to Constantinople as a Papal Legate in 1420.

On 27 September 1421 he was assigned as the Papal Legate at Naples. The kingdoms of Naples and Sicily, in Italy  were then ruled by the Aragonese King, Alfonso V of Aragon. On 22 August 1422, during the visit of the Pope to the Aragonese king at Vicovaro, he died after falling down the stairs at the monastery of Saint Cosimato.

First buried at the Chapel of Saint Thomas in the Vatican, his remains were moved to the Vatican Grotto in 1608, between the tombs of Innocent IV and Marcellus II.

References

External links and additional sources
 (for Chronology of Bishops) 
 (for Chronology of Bishops) 
 (for Chronology of Bishops) 
 (for Chronology of Bishops) 

14th-century births
1422 deaths
People from Olivenza
15th-century Portuguese cardinals